Rakhshān Banietemad (born  April 3, 1954 in Tehran, Iran) is an internationally and critically acclaimed Iranian film director and screenwriter who is widely considered a premier female director and her films have been praised at international festivals as well as being popular with Iranian critics and audiences. Her title as "First Lady of Iranian Cinema" is not only a reference to her prominence as a filmmaker, but  also connotes her social role of merging politics and family in her work. Her signature style is that she focuses on a character that is the representation of a part of the society in order to explore it while staying objectively neutral. The first period of Banietemad's cinematic activity originates from a kind of dark humor, but in the second period of her work, dark humor gives way to serious and influential films, and deeper and broader issues are addressed. Banietemad has a more realistic view of life.

She excels in representing contemporary situations, often in relation to the changing roles of women but also covering a broad spectrum of social issues, including war, poverty, domestic abuse, and class mobility. Banietemad's characters embody a sense of nostalgia, in that women like Tooba (Golab Adineh), Nobar (Fatemah Motamed-Aria), and Sara (Baran Kosari) have become iconic. Yet in revisiting these characters, they are rewritten, re-described, and reinvigorated in dialogue with Iran's present. An oral history of Rakhshan Banietemad's career offers a rich lens into Iranian cinema and culture over nearly three decades.

In the early stages of her career, documentaries were her dominant form of filmmaking. Even after she gained international esteem for her dramatic features, she continued to make documentaries with tremendous success. Our Times (Ruz-egar-e ma, 2002), for example, was the first documentary ever to be released in movie theaters in Iran. It was broadcast on the Franco-German television network ARTE and shown at prestigious festivals such as the International Documentary Film Festival Amsterdam and the Sundance Film Festival. Banietemad's documentary practice has been so effective that her works often change the lives of her subjects. She says that she has “never ended the strong connection that she has always felt with documentaries.”

Early life and education
Rakhshan Banietemad was born on April 3, 1954 in Tehran, Iran, into a middle-class family. While her parents wanted her to pursue a career in teaching, she demonstrated an interest in film from a young age. As a teenager, she decided to study film. She received her Bachelor of Arts degree in film studies from the Dramatic Arts University in Tehran. Banietemad had originally planned to study architecture. When she was about to enter university, she took an exam to enter an intensive course in stage assistance offered by the school of television and cinema and she was one of the 20 people that got in. She studied architecture and stage assistance together, but the next year she took the national exam for the faculty of dramatic arts and chose to study film directing.

Career

1970s and 1980s 
Banietemad started her directing career with documentaries. Some of her early works are The Culture of Consumption (Farhang-e masrafi), Occupation of Migrant Peasants in the City (Mohajerin-e roustai dar shahr) and The War Economic Planning (Tadbirha-ye eqtesadi-e jang). The effect of her early documentary filmmaking can be seen in her narrative films later on.

In 1973, shortly after completing her degree, Banietemad began working for the Iranian television network IRIB (Islamic Republic of Iran Broadcasting) as a script supervisor. Later on, in 1980, she began directing television documentary features. Her films are steeped in the social and economic problems of Iran.

Banietemad has repeatedly mentioned that her stories come from the development of characters that she has seen during her documentary filmmaking. For example, the story of Nargess is from a documentary made for the purpose of studying homeless women, or the character of Touba in the film Under the Skin of the City is the result of her research in a documentary on working women, or the character of "Kabootar" in the movie The Blue Veiled comes out of the character of a rough and harsh woman who was even called "Mr. Ghodrat" (Ghodrat means power which is a male name).

In 1981, Banietemad began working in cinema as a script supervisor on films such as The Liegemen and Chrysanthemum. In 1987, she directed her first feature film Off the Limits. She then revised the script for Canary Yellow and directed it.

1990s to Present 
Banietemad did not receive immediate praise upon entering the film industry. Her early feature films were met by harsh criticism. However, she finally earned critical and popular success in 1991 with her film Nargess. She received the Best Director Award from the Fajr Film Festival, marking the first time in the history of the festival that a woman was awarded the Best Director prize. Since then, she has received numerous awards for her films, including a Bronze Leopard Award for  The Blue-Veiled at the 1995 Locarno Film Festival. Under the Skin of the city, won her the Best Foreign Language Film Award and the Audience Award at the 2001 Turin Film Festival.

At the beginning of the 2000s, Banietemad returned to filmmaking after a period of absence by directing Gilaneh. Gilaneh, which is considered an anti-war film, was nominated for three Crystal Simorghs at the Fajr Film Festival and won a Simorgh for best make-up and a special jury award. Also, Fatemeh Motamedaria won the best actress award.

Mainline and Tales were other works of Banietemad in the early 2000s which Banietemad wrote, directed, and produced. Her film Tales was selected to compete for the Golden Lion at the 71st Venice International Film Festival.

Documentary Films 
While Banietemad's feature films have been acclaimed and honored worldwide, her documentaries have also been successful and popular internationally. Our Times… (2002) was the first documentary ever released in movie theatres in Iran. It was also screened in highly prestigious and prominent festivals and TV channels such as IDFA, Sundance Film Festival and ARTE.

Making documentaries have been her main way of connecting with the society and social issues. Indeed, the realistic aspects and the authentic feel of her feature films stems from her documentary style to life and social matters. Her approach in making documentaries and in depicting the social issues has been so strong and effective that her works have always resulted in causing change in the lives of her documentaries' subjects. Her documentaries center on issues of poverty, criminality, divorce, polygamy, social norms, cultural taboos, women's oppression, and cultural expectations.

With her 2002 film Our Times, Banietemad became the first female filmmaker to explicitly confront the Iran-Iraq war, placing her in an important role in Iranian film history. She has been known to challenge censorship codes to the very edge.

In the 2010s, Banietemad started making documentaries again and producing and collaborating with young filmmakers. Hey, Humans (2016), The Karastan film series (2013-2017) are notable documentaries of this period of Banietemad’s work.

Style 
Banietemad has an interest and an attraction to strong female characters dealing with social issues. In her more recent films, she features female characters from lower classes and incomes who are struggling to make a living. She highlights the strength and resilience of Iranian women as the hope for the future of the country. According to the filmmaker, despite the legal and cultural barriers and the economic hardships for lower income women, their strong nature is the admirable quality about women in Iran. In addition, her films focus on the complex relationships between mothers and their children. This stems from her own experience as a mother in Iran, but also from the Iranian woman's inability to tackle her life without considering her maternal role — a reality that is deeply ingrained in the Iranian patriarchal structure.

In her most recent film, Tales (2014), she seamlessly intersects seven different stories. In these narratives, Banietemad's most memorable women characters once again take the stage, reminding audiences of the historical and cultural significance of her previous films and how she has shaped the history of Iranian cinema in terms of the representation of women.

Despite the predominance of strong female protagonists in her work, Banietemad is not to be associated with feminist filmmaking. In fact, Banietemad has explicitly rejected the label often applied to her by Western film festivals as a "feminist filmmaker." She is more concerned in the universal struggle of society’s lower rungs, regardless of gender. She does not identify with the label due to the implications of the word "feminist," which in Iran has a more negative connotation than in America. According to Banietemad, as long as the understanding of the term remains in Iran, she will disassociate with the label.

In conjunction with her documentary approach to fictional film, Banietemad's signature style consists of films that deal with social issues specific to Iran yet still maintain broad international appeal. She is recognized for reflecting the struggles of Iran's lower classes, the plight of single women and single mothers in Iran, and complicated family relationships. She often examines the duality of human nature in familial and work spaces. To accommodate documentary conventions, her characters directly address the camera.

Legacy
With a collection of films that combine absolute honesty with extraordinary subtlety, Banietemad offers an analysis of the current cultural pressures shaping Iranian women's lives. She is widely recognized among Iranian audiences and critics as one of Iran's most prominent filmmakers, and has also enjoyed international popularity.

She was awarded an honorary degree from SOAS in 2008.

Personal life
She is the wife of Iranian film producer Jahangir Kosari. Her daughter is Iranian actress Baran Kosari, who has worked with her mother throughout most of her films. Kosari began acting from a young age, and she is now a professional actress. She has appeared in her mother's films, as well as those of other Iranian filmmakers.

Humanitarian actions 
Banietemad donated her international prize for the movie Ghesseh-ha to build a shelter for homeless women. She also donated some of her awards to help disadvantaged women.

Filmography

Feature films

Documentaries 
 Karestan Documentary films (artistic consultant), 2013–17:
 Poets of Life
 Puzzleys
 Mother of the Earth
 MAHAK: A World She Founded
 Friends at Work
 Flax to Fire
 Hey, Humans (Ay, Adamha), 2016
 One Hour in a Lifetime (Yek saat az yek omr), 2015
 All My Trees (Hameh derakhtan-e man), 2015 which exmained the work of Mahlagha Mallah
 The Other Side of Mirrors (An sooy-e ayeneh ha), 2014
 The Mirrors Recital (Concert-e ayeneh ha), 2014
 The Concert of the Lords of Secrets (concert-e khodavandan-e asrar), 2014
 Mahak My Home (Khaneh man Mahak), a teamwork, 2014
 Keep Children in School (Bacheh ha ra dar madreseh negahdarim), a teamwork, 2012
 The Room No. 202 (Otahgh-e 202), part of Kahrizak 4 Views, 2012
 I’ll see you Tomorrow Elina (Farda mibinamet Elina), 2010
 We Are Half of Iran's Population (Ma nimi az jameiat-e Iranim), 2009
 Angels of the House of Sun (Hayat khalvate khaneh khorshid), 2009
 Second Home (producer), Director: Mahvash Sheikholeslami, 2008
 3D Carpet (Farsh-e 3 Bodi), Part of "Iranian Carpet", 2007
 Our Times… (Ruzegar-e ma…), 2002
 The Last Visit with Iran Daftari (Akharin didar ba Iran Daftari), 1995
 To Whom Do You Show These Films? (In filmha ra beh ki neshun midin?), 1993
 Spring to Spring (Bahar ta bahar), 1993
 The 1992 Report (Gozaresh-e 71), 1993
 Centralization (Tamarkoz), 1986
 The War Economic Planning (Tadbirha-ye eqtesadi-e jang), 1981
 Occupation of Migrant Peasants in the City (Mohajerin-e roustai dar shahr),1980
 The Culture of Consumption (Farhang-e masrafi), 1979

Honors and awards

 Honorary Golden Cyclo, 23rd Vesoul International Film Festival of Asian Cinema (France), 2017
 Ethics and Prayer Award for social and civilian activities (Iran), 2016
 Cinema Honorary Award, 4th International Women Film Festival (Afghanistan), 2016
 Cinema Honorary Award, 6th International Crime & Punishment Film Festival (Turkey), 2016
 Special Jury Prize, Kahrizak 4 views, Dubai International Film Festival (UAE), 2012
 Prix Henri Langlois, Vincennes International Film Festival (France), 2010
 Special Jury Prize, We Are Half of Iran's Population, (WIFTS) (USA), 2009
 Achievement in Directing, Mainline, Asia Pacific Screen Awards (Australia), 2007
 Best Director & Best Actress, Mainline, Iran Cinema House Awards (Iran), 2007
 Artistic & Cultural Achievement Award, Kara International Film Festival (Pakistan), 2004
 Prince Claus Prize for Culture and Development (The Netherlands), 1998
 "Il Sindaco di Firenze” Peace and Freedom Award (Italy), 1998
 Best Asian Woman Director, The Blue Veiled, India International Film Festival (India), 1996
 Best Film, Off the Limits, Comedy International Film Festival (Italy), 1987
 The Prince Claus Award, 1998
Honorary doctorate, SOAS, University of London (2008) 
Chairperson International jury, at 52nd International Film Festival of India, Goa 2021.

Professional distinctions

 Jury Member, Venice International Film Festival (Italy), 2017
 Academy Oscars Member, Writers Branch, 2017
 President of the jury, Vesoul Film Festival (France), 2017
 President of the jury, Prague Iranian Film Festival (Czech), 2017
 President of the jury, Image Film Festival (Iran), 2016
 President of the jury, Cinema Verite International Film Festival (Iran), 2013
 President of the jury, Busan International Film Festival (South Korea), 2013
 Master Class, California Institute of the Arts (USA), 2013
 Jury Member, Shanghai International Film Festival (China), 2012
 Jury Member, Dubai International Film Festival (UAE), 2010
 Jury Member, Asiatic Film Mediale Festival (Italy), 2010
 Master Class, Walker Art Center, Minneapolis (USA), 2010
 Jury Member, Fribourg International Film Festival (Switzerland), 2010
 Jury Member, Urban International Film Festival (Iran), 2009
 Producer, Heiran, feature-film (Iran), 2009
 Producer, Second House, documentary (Iran), 2008
 Honorary Doctorate, University of London (Iran), 2008
 Master Class, School of Oriental and African Studies, SOAS (England), 2008
 Master Class, Geneva University of Art & Design (ESBA), 2008
 Jury Member, Cinema Verite International Film Festival (Iran), 2007
 Jury Member, Women's Film Festival (Iran), 2006
 Jury Member, Asian Cinema, Fajr International Film Festival (Iran), 2006
 Jury Member, Art University Student Festival (Iran), 2005
 Director, Sony Young Directors Film Festival (Iran), 2003
 Jury Member, Asia Pacific Film Festival (Iran), 2003
 Jury Member, Sony Young Directors Film Festival (Iran), 2002
 Jury Member, Moscow International Film Festival ( Russia), 2002
 Jury Member, Cairo International Film Festival (Egypt), 2002
 Jury Member, Fajr International Film Festival (Iran), 2001
 Jury Member, Montreal World Film Festival (Canada), 2001
 Jury Member, Youth Film Festival (Iran), 2001
 Jury Member, Student Film Festival (Iran), 1999
 Jury Member, Leipzig International Film Festival (Germany), 1999
 Jury Member, Tokyo Environmental International Film Festival (Japan), 1998
 Jury Member, New Delhi International Film Festival (India), 1998
 Jury Member, Student Film Festival (Iran), 1997
 Jury Member, Locarno International Film Festival (Swiss), 1996
 Jury Member, Turin International Film Festival (Italy), 1995
 Jury Member, Center for Iranian Film Directors (Iran), 1993
 Jury Member, Roshd Film Festival (Iran), 1992
 Jury Member, Fajr International Film Festival (Iran), 1990

Further reading
 Cobbey, Rini. "Under the Skin of the City; Under the Surface Contrasts." Film in the Middle East and North Africa. Ed. Josef Gugler. Austin: Texas UP, 2011. 84-93.
 "Rakhshan Banietemad." Firouzan Films. 2011. Firouzan Films.
 Moruzzi, Norma Claire. "Women in Iran: Notes on Film and from the Field." Feminist Studies. 27.1(2001): 89-100.
 Whatley, Sheri. "Iranian Women Film Directors: A Clever Activism." Off Our Backs. 33.3/4(2003): 30-32.

See also
 Persian women's movement
 Langerood (village of Espili in Gilan)

References

External links
 
 "The Cinema and Rakhshan Banietemad", April 19, 2008, Centre for Media and Film Studies, SOAS, University of London.
 Bidisha, What will British audiences make of a great Iranian auteur?, The Guardian, April 23, 2008
 "Honorary Doctorate of University of London for Rakhshan Banietemad", in Persian, BBC Persian, Wednesday July 23, 2008.
 We are half of the Iranian population, a non-partisan documentary by Banietemad in which women ask questions of the 2009 Iranian presidential candidates, in Persian, 7 June 2009: Part 1, Part 2, Part 3, Part 4, Part 5. Note: The text in the opening part of this documentary grants permission for non-profit public viewing.

Iranian women film directors
Iranian screenwriters
Persian-language film directors
Writers from Tehran
1954 births
Members of the National Council for Peace
Crystal Simorgh for Best Director winners
Crystal Simorgh for Best Screenplay winners
Asia Pacific Screen Award winners
Living people